The 1995 Ginebra San Miguel season was the 17th season of the franchise in the Philippine Basketball Association (PBA).

Draft picks

Summary
Ginebra bowed to Shell Rimula-X, 88-100, in the opening game of the season on February 19. The Gins lost their first three outings but found success during their out-of-town matches by winning against Shell, 129-120 on March 5 in Cabanatuan City, and Pepsi, 106-95 in San Fernando, Pampanga on March 11.  The Ginebras won their last game in the eliminations over Purefoods, 106-86 on April 7, but were eliminated in the All-Filipino Cup semifinals along with San Miguel Beermen and Pepsi Mega. All three teams finish with four wins and six losses.

Former Detroit Piston Isaiah Morris was Ginebra's import in the Commissioners Cup, the Ginebras won just once in the eliminations against Pepsi Mega, 122-116, in their third game on June 18 where Morris scored 50 points.  The Gins lost their last seven matches for a dismal 1-9 won-loss slate. Morris played six games and was replaced by Darryl Prue, who played three games and with one assignment left for Ginebra in the elimination round, Prue was sent home and coming in was Alexander Coles, who was somehow impressive in the only game he played, a 106-112 Ginebra loss to Sta.Lucia on July 16. Coles later wowed the fans in the slam dunk contest during the All-Star Weekend.

In the Governors Cup, Andre Hardy played three games and was replaced by Antonio Madison. Ginebra went winless in 10 games in the elimination round and lost their last 17 games for a forgettable campaign, an overall season record of five wins and 25 losses, the worst in their franchise history.

Roster

Transactions

Additions

Trades

Subtractions
{| cellspacing="0"
| valign="top" |

Recruited imports

References

Barangay Ginebra San Miguel seasons
Ginebra